The 1987 Afro-Asian Club Championship, was the 2nd Afro-Asian Club Championship competition endorsed by the Confederation of African Football (CAF) and Asian Football Confederation (AFC), contested between the winners of the African Champions' Cup and the Asian Club Championship, it was the last time were contested over a single match; from 1988 until 1998 the competition was held in a two-legged tie format.

The match took place on 5 February 1988, in Cairo Stadium in Cairo, Egypt, between Zamalek, the 1986 African Cup of Champions Clubs winner, and Furukawa Electric (Now JEF United Ichihara), the 1986 Asian Club Championship winner.
Zamalek won the match 2–0 and became the first African team to win the championship.

Teams

Match details

Winners

References

 http://www.angelfire.com/ak/EgyptianSports/ZamalekAfroAsian.html#1987
 

1987
1988 in African football
1988 in Asian football
Zamalek SC matches
JEF United Chiba matches
February 1988 sports events in Africa
1988 in Japanese football
1987–88 in Egyptian football
International club association football competitions hosted by Egypt